Arturo Daniel Monllor (born 20 July 1984) is an Argentine football goalkeeper who currently plays for Estudiantes BA.

Career
Born in Posadas, Monllor started his career at Nueva Chicago in the Argentine second tier, adding up nearly 100 league appearances in the 10 seasons he spent there.

On 28 June 2014, Monllor moved abroad for the first time in his career, joining newly promoted Boavista in Portugal. He debuted on 17 August 2014, in a match against Braga, but only appeared sporadically throughout his first year, acting mainly as back-up to Mika. He terminated his contract with Boavista in July 2015, but only joined Deportivo Armenio in the Primera C in February 2016.

References

External links

 BDFA statistics 

1984 births
Living people
People from Posadas, Misiones
Argentine footballers
Argentine expatriate footballers
Nueva Chicago footballers
Boavista F.C. players
Deportivo Armenio footballers
Talleres de Remedios de Escalada footballers
Club Atlético Colegiales (Argentina) players
Club Atlético Los Andes footballers
Sacachispas Fútbol Club players
Estudiantes de Buenos Aires footballers
Association football goalkeepers
Argentine Primera División players
Primeira Liga players
Primera Nacional players
Primera B Metropolitana players
Expatriate footballers in Portugal
Argentine expatriate sportspeople in Portugal
Sportspeople from Misiones Province